Stora Karlsö Lighthouse, is a Swedish lighthouse on Stora Karlsö island off Gotland in the Baltic Sea. It was built in 1887 and resulted in the first permanent settlement on the island in modern times. A house for the lighthouse keeper was built in the 1930s. In 1974, the lighthouse became fully automated when a cable for electricity was laid to the island and the last permanent residents left the island.

In 2010, the lighthouse was decommissioned and replaced by a solar cell powered lamp on a mast next to the lighthouse.

References

External links 
Stora Karlsö Lighthouse

Lighthouses in Sweden
Tourist attractions in Gotland County
Lighthouses completed in 1887
Buildings and structures in Gotland County
1887 establishments in Sweden